Corcovetella is a monotypic genus of Brazilian jumping spiders containing the single species, Corcovetella aemulatrix. It was first described by María Elena Galiano in 1975, and is only found in Brazil.

References

External links
 Photographs of Corcovetella species from Brazil

Monotypic Salticidae genera
Salticidae
Spiders of Brazil